Becky Schmitz is an Iowa politician.  She was the Iowa State Senator from the 45th District, serving from 2007 till 2011. She was elected to the Jefferson County Board of Supervisors in November 2012.  She assumed office January 1, 2013 for a 4-year term.

Schmitz served on several committees in the Iowa Senate - the Economic Growth committee; the Education committee; the Government Oversight committee; the State Government committee; the Ways and Means committee; and the Human Resources committee, where she was vice chair.

Schmitz was elected in 2006 with 10,326 votes (50%), defeating Republican opponent David Miller.

References

External links
 

Democratic Party Iowa state senators
Living people
Year of birth missing (living people)
Women state legislators in Iowa
Place of birth missing (living people)
21st-century American women